The 2011 American Le Mans Series season was a multi-event motor racing series for sports racing cars which conform to the technical regulations laid out by the International Motor Sports Association for the American Le Mans Series. It was the thirteenth season of the American Le Mans Series, a sports car racing series that drew original inspiration from the types of racing cars that compete in the 24 Hours of Le Mans, and the 41st season for the IMSA GT Championship, as this series traces its lineage to the 1971 IMSA GT Championship. The full title of the 2011 series is "the American Le Mans Series presented by Tequila Patrón" to include the principal sponsor. The season began March 19, 2011 with the 12 Hours of Sebring and ended after nine rounds on October 1 with the Petit Le Mans.

While Lola-built sports cars dominated the upper racing positions in the faster LMP classes for sports prototype vehicles, their numbers continued to drop to the point where at the third round of the series at 2011 Northeast Grand Prix no LMP2 class cars were entered. The only growth in prototype numbers has been in spec racing class LMPC in which all class competitors use identical Oreca chassis powered by a Chevrolet engine.

The Lola-Mazda of the Dyson Racing Team and its drivers Chris Dyson and Guy Smith won the LMP1 class championship at the penultimate race at Mazda Raceway Laguna Seca, holding a 32-point gap over the Muscle Milk Motorsports team and driver Klaus Graf. Level 5 Motorsports ran unopposed for the majority of the season in LMP2 with their Lola-HPDs. Christophe Bouchut and Scott Tucker also wrapped up the championship early.

LMPC title remained live until the final race of the season where Genoa Racing's Eric Lux and the Core Autosport pair of Gunnar Jeannette and Ricardo González ended tied on points, and had the same number of second, third, fourth and fifth-place finishes.

In the Grand Touring classes, Rahal Letterman Lanigan Racing's BMW M3 GT2 driven by Dirk Müller and Joey Hand won the championship, taking three wins and three podiums. They wrapped up the class title a round early, having held a 33-point lead over the Chevrolet pair of Oliver Gavin and Jan Magnussen. Black Swan Racing driver Tim Pappas clinched the GTC spec racing class for Porsche 997s at the final round by winning the class.

Schedule
On August 22, 2010, IMSA announced an initial 2011 calendar with ten events, expanding from nine in 2010.  Two unnamed events were added to the calendar, while the series race at Miller Motorsports Park in Utah was not retained.  A race in the Bricktown section of Oklahoma City had been proposed, but was rejected by the city's council.  It was announced in February 2010 that the Baltimore Grand Prix street race was being taken into consideration for one of the series' new rounds.  The race was confirmed on September 1, 2010.  All races this season were seen live on ESPN3.com, and on delay on ESPN2 and ABC.

Two rounds on the 2011 schedule, the 12 Hours of Sebring and Petit Le Mans, also served as part of the 2011 Intercontinental Le Mans Cup.

Season results
The 12 Hours of Sebring and Petit Le Mans, as part of the 2011 Intercontinental Le Mans Cup, featured cars competing in the GTE-Am category alongside normal ALMS competitors in the GT2 category. Krohn Racing's Ferrari F430 won both of the races.

The winner represented here is the highest finisher of both classes combined.

Overall winners in bold.

Championships
Points were awarded to the top ten cars and drivers which complete at least 70% of their class winner's distance. Teams with multiple entries only score the points of their highest finishing entry in each race. Drivers were required to drive a minimum of 45 minutes to earn points, except for the Long Beach event which required only 30 minutes.  Drivers are required to complete a particular amount of the minimum number of laps in order to earn points. The number of laps vary depending on the course size.

Team championships
Teams with full season entries are awarded points in the team championships.  Teams which participated in a partial season or on a race-by-race basis are not included in these championships.

As long as they compete full season and comply with ACO regulations, the top LMP1, LMP2 and GT team at the end of the season receive an automatic entry to the 2012 24 Hours of Le Mans.

LMP1 standings

LMP2 standings

LMPC standings
All teams utilize the Oreca FLM09 chassis with Chevrolet LS3 engine.

GT standings

GTC standings
All teams utilize variations of the Porsche 997 GT3 Cup.

Driver championships
Drivers who participated in races but failed to score points over the course of the season are not listed.

LMP1 standings

LMP2 standings

LMPC standings
Drivers in the LMPC category are allowed to drive for more than one car during an event.  If a driver is in each car for a minimum of two hours each, he is allowed to score the points from whichever car he chooses.

GT standings

GTC standings

Team changes
Reigning LMPC champions Level 5 Motorsports have announced that they will move to the LMP2 class for 2011. They will run a Lola B11/40 and a Lola B08/80 coupé with Honda engines. Team owner Scott Tucker, Christophe Bouchut, and Luis Díaz have been confirmed as drivers.

References

External links
 American Le Mans Series
 International Motor Sports Association

American Le Mans Series seasons
American Le Mans Series
American Le Mans Series